John Allan Arte (born February 22, 1993) is a Brazilian mixed martial artist who competes in the Light Heavyweight division. He formerly competed in the Ultimate Fighting Championship.

Background
When Allan was 14 years old, he entered a Muay Thai gym with the goal of losing weight. Around 17, he went to Jiu-Jitsu. He then migrated to MMA and did not leave. Before turning pro, he also played amateur basketball, from 15 to 19 years old.

Mixed martial arts career

Early career
Allan made his professional debut against Fabiano Rodrigues on September 15, 2012, losing his first MMA fight by heel hook in under a minute. He would go on to compile a 12–4 record on the Brazilian regional scene.

At Dana White's Contender Series Brazil 3 on August 11, 2018, Allan fell short to eventual contract-winner Vinicius Moreira via second-round triangle choke submission despite a successful first round that saw Allan bloody his fellow Brazilian.

At Future FC 6 on June 28, 2019, Allan defeated previously undefeated prospect Alexandre Silva via second-round TKO in a barnburner of a fight.

Ultimate Fighting Championship
Allan made his UFC debut against Mike Rodríguez on July 13, 2019, at UFC Fight Night: de Randamie vs. Ladd. He originally won the fight via unanimous decision. However, Allan tested positive for banned hormone and metabolic modulator tamoxifen for which he received a one-year USADA suspension, which began on began on July 13, 2019, and was fined $4,800 by the California State Athletic Commission which overruled the original decision to a no contest.

Allan, as a replacement for Gerald Meerschaert, was scheduled to face Ed Herman on September 12, 2020, at UFC Fight Night: Waterson vs. Hill. Allan was removed from the fight in early September as he faced travel restrictions related to the COVID-19 pandemic and was replaced by Mike Rodríguez.

Allan faced Roman Dolidze at UFC on ESPN: Hermansson vs. Vettori on December 5, 2020. He lost the bout via split decision; however 19 out of 19 media members scored it a 30-27 for Dolidze.

Allan was expected to face Aleksa Camur on November 6, 2021, at UFC 268. However, Camur pulled out of the bout citing an undisclosed injury and was replaced by Dustin Jacoby. Allan lost the bout via unanimous decision.

Allan was released by the UFC in November 2021 following his loss to Jacoby.

Post UFC 
In his first appearance after his UFC release, Allan faced Diego Dias on September 25, 2022 at Fight Music Show 2. He lost the bout via unanimous decision.

Allan returned not long after against Marcos del Vigna on November 19, 2022 at Prime Fights 1, where he knocked him out in the first round.

Championships and accomplishments

Mixed martial arts
ShowFight
 LHW Tournament Championship (One time)

Mixed martial arts record

|-
|
|align=center|
|Ewerton Polaquini
|
|Imortal FC 12
|
|align=center|
|align=center|
|Curitiba, Brazil
|
|-
|Win
|align=center|14–7 (1)
|Marcos del Vigna
|KO (punches)
|Prime Fights 1
|
|align=center|1
|align=center|1:37
|Campo Largo, Brazil
|
|-
|Loss
|align=center|13–7 (1)
|Diego Dias
|Decision (unanimous)
|Fight Music Show 2
|
|align=center|3
|align=center|5:00
|Curitiba, Brazil
|
|-
|Loss
|align=center|13–7 (1)
|Dustin Jacoby
|Decision (unanimous)
|UFC 268
|
|align=center|3
|align=center|5:00
|New York City, New York, United States
|
|-
| Loss
| align=center| 13–6 (1)
| Roman Dolidze
| Decision (split)
| UFC on ESPN: Hermansson vs. Vettori
|
|align=Center|3
|align=center|5:00
|Las Vegas, Nevada, United States
|
|-
|NC
| align=center| 13–5 (1)
| Mike Rodriguez
|NC (overturned)
|UFC Fight Night: de Randamie vs. Ladd
|
|align=center|3
|align=center|5:00
|Sacramento, California, United States
|
|-
| Win
| align=center| 13–5
| Alexandre Silva
| TKO (punches)
| Future FC 6
| 
| align=center| 2
| align=center| 1:33
|São Paulo, Brazil
| 
|-
| Loss
| align=center| 12–5
| Vinicius Moreira
|Submission (triangle choke)
|Dana White's Contender Series Brazil 3
|
|align=center|2
|align=center|3:40
|Las Vegas, Nevada, United States
| 
|-
| Win
| align=center| 12–4
| Edvaldo de Oliveira
| Submission (arm-triangle choke)
| Imortal FC 8
| 
| align=center|3
| align=center| 2:38
| São José dos Pinhais, Brazil
|
|-
| Win
| align=center| 11–4
| Rafael Monteiro
| TKO (punches)
| Imortal FC 7
| 
| align=center| 2
| align=center|1:08
| São José dos Pinhais, Brazil
| 
|-
| Loss
| align=center| 10–4
| Adilson Costa Ferreira
|Decision (unanimous)
|BFC: Maranhao vs. Curitiba
|
|align=center|3 
|align=center|5:00
|São Luís, Brazil
|
|-
| Win
| align=center| 9–4
| Matheus Scheffel
|TKO (punches)
|Samurai FC / PFE 13
|
|align=center|1
|align=center|4:36
|Curitiba, Brazil
|
|-
| Loss
| align=center| 8–4
| Michał Fijałka
| Submission (rear-naked choke)
| XCage 9
| 
| align=center| 2
| align=center| 1:11
| Toruń, Poland
|
|-
| Win
| align=center|8–3
| Alex Junius
| TKO (punches)
|rowspan=2 | Show Fight 31
|rowspan=2 | 
| align=center|1
| align=center|0:00
|rowspan=2 | Curitiba, Brazil
|
|-
| Win
| align=center|7–3
| Rafael Monteiro
| TKO (retirement)
| align=center|2
| align=center|5:00
|
|-
| Loss
| align=center|6–3
| Thiago Florindo
| Submission (arm-triangle choke)
| Frontline Fight Series 1
| 
| align=center|2
| align=center|0:00
| Curitiba, Brazil
|
|-
| Win
| align=center|6–2
| Leonardo Gosling
| TKO (punches)
| University of Champions 5
| 
| align=center|1
| align=center|1:18
| Curitiba, Brazil
|
|-
| Win
| align=center| 5–2
| Bruno Marks
| TKO 
| Curitiba Top Fight 9
| 
| align=center|1
| align=center|2:04
| Curitiba, Brazil
| 
|-
| Win
| align=center| 4–2
| Tassio Bomfim de Paula Souza
| Submission
| Gladiator Combat Fight 8
|
|align=Center|1
|align=center|1:55
|Curitiba, Brazil
| 
|-
| Win
| align=center| 3–2
| Leandro Frast
| TKO (punches)
| Curitiba Fight Pro 2
| 
| align=center| 1
| align=center| 1:15
| Curitiba, Brazil
| 
|-
| Loss
| align=center| 2–2
| Rodrigo Jesus
| Decision (unanimous)
| Samurai Fight Combat / Power Fight Extreme 10
| 
| align=center| 3
| align=center| 5:00
| Curitiba, Brazil
| 
|-
| Win
| align=center| 2–1
| Marcio Telles
| Submission (heel hook)
| Impactotal Fight 4
| 
| align=center| 1
| align=center| 1:08
| Garça, Brazil
| 
|-
| Win
| align=center| 1–1
| Cezar Alves
| TKO (punches)
| Full Fight Combat
| 
| align=center| 1
| align=center| 3:40
| Venâncio Aires, Brazil
|
|-
| Loss
| align=center| 0–1
| Cesar Fabiano Rodrigues
| Submission (heel hook)
| Quality Fighting Championship
| 
| align=center| 1
| align=center| 0:48
| Araçatuba, Brazil
|

See also 
 List of male mixed martial artists

References

External links 
  
 

1993 births
Living people
Brazilian male mixed martial artists
Light heavyweight mixed martial artists
Mixed martial artists utilizing Brazilian jiu-jitsu
Brazilian practitioners of Brazilian jiu-jitsu
Ultimate Fighting Championship male fighters
Sportspeople from Curitiba